Irma Thomas ( Lee; born February 18, 1941) is an American singer from New Orleans. She is known as the "Soul Queen of New Orleans".

Thomas is a contemporary of Aretha Franklin and Etta James, but never experienced their level of commercial success. In 2007, she won the Grammy Award for Best Contemporary Blues Album for After the Rain, her first Grammy in a career spanning over 50 years.

Life and career
Born Irma Lee, in Ponchatoula, Louisiana, United States, she was the daughter of Percy Lee, a steel chipper, and Vader Lee, who worked as a maid. As a teenager, she sang with a Baptist church choir. She auditioned for Specialty Records at the age of 13. By the time she was 19, she had been married twice and had four children. Keeping her second ex-husband's surname, she worked as a waitress in New Orleans, occasionally singing with bandleader Tommy Ridgley, who helped her land a record deal with the local Ron label. Her first single, "Don't Mess with My Man", was released in late 1959, and reached number 22 on the US Billboard R&B chart.

She then began recording on the Minit label, working with songwriter and producer Allen Toussaint on songs including "It's Raining" and "Ruler of My Heart", which was later reinterpreted by Otis Redding as "Pain in My Heart". Imperial Records acquired Minit in 1963, and a string of successful releases followed. These included "Wish Someone Would Care", her biggest national hit; its B-side "Breakaway", written by Jackie DeShannon and Sharon Sheely (later covered by Tracey Ullman, among others).

"Anyone Who Knows What Love Is (Will Understand)" was co-written by a young Randy Newman and future country star Jeannie Seely. This song has gained renewed appreciation as a result of its inclusion in numerous episodes of the science fiction anthology television series Black Mirror, stretching back to the first season. On its B-side is "Time Is on My Side", a song previously recorded by Kai Winding and later by the Rolling Stones.

Her first four Imperial singles all charted on Billboards pop chart, but her later releases were less successful. Unlike her contemporaries Aretha Franklin, Gladys Knight and Dionne Warwick, she never managed to cross over into mainstream commercial success. She recorded for Chess Records in 1967–1968 with some success; her version of the Otis Redding song "Good to Me" reached the R&B chart. She then relocated to California, releasing records on various small labels, before returning to Louisiana, and in the early 1980s opened the Lion's Den Club.

Down by Law, the 1986 independent film by Jim Jarmusch featured "It's Raining" in the soundtrack. The film's actors Roberto Benigni and Nicoletta Braschi, whose characters fell in love in the movie, danced to the song.

After several years' break from recording, she was signed by Rounder Records, and in 1991 earned her first Grammy Award nomination for Live! Simply the Best, recorded in San Francisco. She subsequently released a number of traditional gospel albums, together with more secular recordings. The album Sing It! (1998) was nominated for a Grammy in 1999.

Thomas was still active as a performer as of 2021, appearing annually at the New Orleans Jazz & Heritage Festival (and was scheduled to appear at the iterations that were canceled due to the COVID-19 pandemic). She reigned as Queen of the Krewe du Vieux for the 1998 New Orleans Mardi Gras season. She often headlined at her own club, but it went out of business due to Hurricane Katrina, which caused her to relocate to Gonzales, Louisiana,  from New Orleans.  she was back in her home in New Orleans.

Thomas is interviewed on screen and appears in performance footage in the 2005 documentary film Make It Funky!, which presents a history of New Orleans music and its influence on rhythm and blues, rock and roll, funk and jazz. In the film, she performed "Old Records" with Allen Toussaint.

In April 2007, Thomas was honored for her contributions to Louisiana music with induction into the Louisiana Music Hall of Fame. Also in 2007, Thomas accepted an invitation to participate in Goin' Home: A Tribute to Fats Domino where, singing with Marcia Ball, she contributed "I Just Can't Get New Orleans Off My Mind". The same year she won the Grammy Award for Best Contemporary Blues Album for After the Rain.

In August 2009, a compilation album with three new songs titled The Soul Queen of New Orleans: 50th Anniversary Celebration was released from Rounder Records to commemorate Thomas' 50th year as a recording artist.

Thomas was the subject of the 2008 New Orleans Jazz & Heritage Festival poster. She was chosen as the subject before the painting was chosen for the poster. Artist Douglas Bourgeois painted the singer in 2006. In 2010, Thomas rode in the New Orleans parade "Grela". In April that year, Thomas performed at the Corner Hotel, Richmond, Victoria, Australia.

In 2011, Thomas performed twice at the Byron Bay Bluesfest in Byron Bay, New South Wales, Australia. On April 24, she performed on the Crossroads stage, coming on after Mavis Staples; then on April 25, she headlined the Crossroads stage, coming on after Jethro Tull and Osibisa.

In 2013, Thomas was nominated for a Blues Music Award in the "Soul Blues Female Artist" category, which she duly won. She won the same award in 2014.

In 2018, Thomas received the Lifetime Achievement Award for Performance at the Americana Music Honors & Awards.

Artists worked with
Tommy Ridgley
Eddie Bo
Edgar Blanchard
Bill Sinigal
Irving Banister
Patsy Vidalia
Marcia Ball
Dr. John
Allen Toussaint
Hugh Laurie
Skip Easterling
Danny White

Influences
Etta James
Mahalia Jackson
Pearl Bailey
Nancy Wilson
Brook Benton
John Lee Hooker
Percy Mayfield

Discography

Singles

Albums

Compilation albums

Guest appearances

Filmography

References

External links

1941 births
Living people
20th-century African-American women singers
American women singers
American rhythm and blues singers
Contemporary blues musicians
Delgado Community College alumni
Imperial Records artists
Chess Records artists
Island Records artists
Rounder Records artists
Minit Records artists
Rhythm and blues musicians from New Orleans
People from Ponchatoula, Louisiana
American soul musicians
Grammy Award winners
Alive Naturalsound Records artists
American blues singers
Blues musicians from Louisiana
Singers from Louisiana
Musicians from New Orleans
21st-century African-American people
21st-century African-American women
Maison de Soul Records artists